Cristóbal Pérez (born 23 August 1952) is a Colombian former professional racing cyclist. He rode in two editions of the Tour de France. He also rode in the team time trial event at the 1976 Summer Olympics.

References

External links
 

1952 births
Living people
Colombian male cyclists
Sportspeople from Boyacá Department
Cyclists at the 1976 Summer Olympics
Olympic cyclists of Colombia
20th-century Colombian people